The Oakdale Joint Unified School District serves approximately 5,200 students in Oakdale, California, USA. The Oakdale Union Elementary School District and the Oakdale Joint Union High School District were merged, to create the Oakdale Joint Unified School District, on 1 July 1998. The superintendent is Dave Kline.

Schools
 Oakdale High School; mascot is the mustang.
 Oakdale Junior High School; mascot is the ram.
 East Stanislaus High School; mascot is the Knight.
 Cloverland Elementary School; mascot is the cougar.
 Fair Oaks Elementary School; mascot is the falcon.
 Magnolia Elementary School; mascot is the bear.
 Sierra View Elementary School; mascot is the coyote.

References

External links
 Official site

School districts established in 1998
School districts in Stanislaus County, California
1998 establishments in California